Hardiya is a village development committee in Saptari District in the Sagarmatha Zone of south-eastern Nepal. At the time of the 2011 Nepal census it had a population of 5,286 people living in 1,139 individual households.

Hardiya, according to Nepal's statistics falls in Ward Number 6 and has people of different casts including mukhiya, saha, yadav, chaudhari etc.

Inhabitants

 Mukhiya (Malah)
 Chaudhari (Tharu)
Sah (Teli)
Yadav (Guwar)
Chamar (RAM)
Mandal (Khatbe)

Languages spoken

Most of the people in Hardiya speaks Maithili. However, there are other languages that are well practices among people including Hindi, Nepali, English and Bhojpuri.

Festivals

People follow most of the festivals celebrated in Nepal. Some of the important festivals are Dashan, Tihar, Chhat, Shivaratri, etc.

Cultural heritages

Hardiya preserves some of the important heritages of Nepal. Most of these heritages are protected by local communities. Some of the important one are listed below:
kamlasthan
rajajisthan
dinabhadristhan

References

Populated places in Saptari District
VDCs in Saptari District